Agni-V is a land based nuclear capable intercontinental ballistic missile ICBM developed by the Defence Research and Development Organisation (DRDO) of India. The missile has a range of more than 7,000 kilometers. Chinese researchers allege that the missile has the range of 8,000 kilometers. It is a three-stage, road-mobile, canisterised, solid-fueled intercontinental ballistic missile.

Development

Agni V is primarily for enhancing India's nuclear deterrence against China. Until recently, the longest range missile India had was Agni-III, with a range of 3500 km. If launched from central India this range was not sufficient to reach targets on the extreme eastern and northeastern region of China. Most of the important economic centers of China lay on its eastern seaboard.

Senior defence scientist M. Natarajan disclosed in 2007 that DRDO was working on an upgraded version of the Agni III, known as the Agni-V, and that it would be ready in 4 years.

It was estimated that the missile will be operational by 2014 to 2015 after four to five repeatable tests. Indian authorities believed that the solid-fuelled Agni-V is more than adequate to meet current threat perceptions and security concerns. Even with a range of only 5,000 km, the Agni-V could hit any target in China, including Beijing. 

The missile will allow India to strike targets across Asia and into Europe. The missile's range will allow the Indian military to target all of China from Agni-V bases, in central and southern India, further away from China. The missile is also likely to be similar to other missiles of the range of 10,000 km. The missile was designed to be easy to transport by road, through the utilisation of a canister-launch missile system, which is distinct from those of the earlier Agni missiles. Agni-V would also carry MIRV (multiple independently targetable re-entry vehicles) payloads being concurrently developed. A single MIRV equipped missile can deliver multiple warheads at different targets.

The second and third stage are completely made of composite material to reduce weight. With a canister-launch system to impart higher road mobility, the missile, will give the armed forces much greater operational flexibility than the earlier-generation of Agni missiles. According to a source, the accuracy levels of Agni-V and the Agni-IV, with their better guidance and navigation systems, are far higher than Agni-I, Agni-II and Agni-III. According to the Project Director of Agni V, Tessy Thomas, the missile achieved single-digit accuracy in its second test.

Deployment 
According to media reports that cite official sources, the missile was being deployed by Strategic Forces Command as of July 2018. After the sixth test of Agni-V in June 2018 the missile has been inducted into the Strategic Forces Command of the Indian Armed Forces. .

Testing

Preparation for testing
The then Indian defence minister A. K. Antony, addressing the annual DRDO awards ceremony, asked defence scientists to demonstrate the  missile's capability at the earliest opportunity. DRDO chief V. K. Saraswat told Times of India in mid-2011 that DRDO had tested the three solid-propellant composite rocket motor stages of Agni-V independently and all ground tests had been completed. In September 2011, Saraswat confirmed that the first test flight would be conducted in 2012 from Wheeler Island off the Orissa coast.

In February 2012, a source revealed that DRDO was almost ready for the test, but there were scheduling and logistical issues since the missile was to traverse halfway across the Indian Ocean. Countries like Indonesia and Australia as well as international air and maritime traffic in the test zone had to be alerted 7– 10 days before the test. Moreover, Indian Navy warships, with DRDO scientists and tracking and monitoring systems, were to be positioned midway and near the impact point in the southern Indian Ocean.

First test launch
On 19 April 2012 at 08.05 am, the Agni V was successfully test-fired by DRDO from Wheeler Island off the coast of Orissa. The test launch was made from the Launch Complex 4 of the Integrated Test Range (ITR) at Wheeler Island using a rail mobile launcher. The director of the test range, S.P. Das, informed BBC that all test parameters were met. According to news reports the Agni-V was able to hit the target nearly at pin-point accuracy, within a few meters of the designated target point.

Second test launch
On 15 September 2013, India conducted a second test flight of Agni-V from the Wheeler Island off Odisha coast. The missile was test-fired from a mobile launcher from Launch Complex 4 of the Integrated Test Range (ITR) at about 8:50 am. The flight duration was a little over 20 minutes and hit the pre-designed target in the Indian Ocean with an accuracy of a few metres.

Third test launch
On 31 January 2015, India conducted a third successful test flight of the Agni-V from the Wheeler Island facility. The test used a canisterised version of the missile, mounted over a Tatra truck. The Integrated Test Range Director, M. V. K. V. Prasad, said: "The missile, witnessed a flawless 'auto launch' and detailed results will be known after all data is retrieved from different radars and network systems."

Fourth test launch 
On 26 December 2016, a fourth test of the missile was successfully conducted from complex 4 of Wheeler Island, Orissa at 11.05 IST. This was the second canisterised test of the missile and will now pave way for user trials of the missile by the Strategic Forces Command (SFC).

Fifth test launch 
On 18 January 2018, a fifth test of the missile was successfully conducted from the Wheeler Island facility, Odisha at 09.53 IST. This was the third consecutive canisterised test of the missile on a road mobile launcher and the first in its final operational configuration. The missile covered a distance of 4,900 km in 19 minutes.

Sixth test launch 
On 3 June 2018, a sixth test launch of Agni-V was successfully conducted from Abdul Kalam Island at 09.45 IST. It was the sixth missile test since 2012 and was a "precision launch". The Indian Ministry of Defence stated that the radars, electro-tracking stations, and telemetry stations tracked the vehicle throughout the course.

Seventh test launch 
On 10 December 2018, a seventh test launch of Agni-V was successfully conducted from the Launching Complex-IV of the Integrated Test Range (ITR) at Abdul Kalam Island at about 1.30 pm. This was for the first time that the missile was test-fired in a lofted trajectory. The missile blasted off from a hermetically sealed canister and covered nearly 2,041 km. This lofted trajectory flight was used to determine whether it followed the perfect flight path with close to zero error. This trial completed the Agni-V pre-induction trials.

User Trials
As part of user trial, Agni-V was successfully launched on October 27, 2021 and December 15, 2022 from Abdul Kalam Island, Odisha. According to Ministry of Defence (MoD), the test was in line with India’s credible minimum deterrence policy with the commitment to ‘No First Use’.

Night trial 
On 15 December 2022, first night trial of Agni-V was successfully carried out by SFC from Abdul Kalam Island, Odisha. The test was to validate new technologies and equipment on the missile. Replacing maraging steel with lightweight composite materials made Agni-V, 20 percent lighter. The launch also proved striking capability beyond 7000+ kms. The missile test in night sky was seen in many parts of India and its neighboring countries and was sometimes mistaken as a meteor or a UFO. The test was also suspected to have included a Hypersonic glide vehicle due to the low velocity of the projectile as seen in the camera-shot images although authorities remained silent on the issue. A familiar source described that "it may not be a test of Agni 5 and something much bigger".

Description

Propulsion
The Agni-V is a three-stage solid fuelled intercontinental ballistic missile with composite motor casing in the second and third stage. In many aspects, the Agni-5 carries forward the Agni-3 pedigree. With composites used extensively to reduce weight, and a third stage added on (the Agni-3 was a two-stage missile), the Agni-5 can fly significantly more to inter-continental range.

Total flight duration for the first flight test of Agni-V on 20 April 2012 was for 1130 seconds. The first stage ignited for 90 seconds.

Range

The DRDO chief V. K. Saraswat initially declined to disclose the exact range of Agni-V. Later, however, he described Agni V as a missile with a range of 5,500–5,800 km. Wenlong also said that the Indian government had deliberately downplayed the missile's capability in order to avoid causing concern to other countries. The exact range of the Agni-V missile is classified. Business Standard reported that the range of Agni-V can be increased if needed. On 15 December 2022, the first night trial of Agni-V was successfully carried out by the SFC, after which media reports stated that the missile is now 20 percent lighter due to the use of composite materials that can increase the range beyond 7,000 km if required.

Guidance and control 
A ring laser gyroscope based inertial navigation system (RLG-INS) is primarily responsible for guiding the Agni-V to its target. However, Agni-V is equipped with another guidance system called micro inertial navigation system (MINGS) as a backup. These are capable of interacting with Indian and non-Indian satellite navigation systems. Both of these systems have been developed by the Research Centre Imarat. Agni V uses a system on chip (SOC) based on-board computer (OBC) whose weight is around 200 grams for control and guidance. All stages of the missile have nozzle-based control systems.

Mobility

"The Agni-5 is specially tailored for road-mobility," explained Avinash Chander, Director, ASL. "With the canister having been successfully developed, all India's future land-based strategic missiles will be canisterised as well." The missile will utilise a canister and will be launched from it. Made of maraging steel, a canister must provide a hermetically sealed atmosphere that preserves the missile for years.

If the missile is ejected using a gas generator from the canister, then the missile could be launched from any pre-surveyed launch
location without the need for any pre-built launch site.

The launcher, which is known as the Transport-cum-Tilting vehicle-5, is a 140-ton, 30-metre, 7-axle trailer pulled by a 3-axle Volvo truck (DRDO Newsletter 2014). The canister design "will reduce the reaction time drastically...just a few minutes from 'stop-to-launch
’

Anti-satellite version

V. K. Saraswat said that an ASAT version is technically possible: ASAT weapon would require reaching about 800 km altitude. Agni V offers the boosting capability and the 'kill vehicle', with advanced seekers, will be able to home into the target satellite.

MIRVs
In future, Agni-V is expected to feature Multiple independently targetable reentry vehicle (MIRVs) with each missile being capable of carrying 2–10 separate nuclear warheads. Each warhead can be assigned to a different target, separated by hundreds of kilometres; alternatively, two or more warheads can be assigned to one target. MIRVs ensure a credible second strike capability even with few missiles. According to DRDO sources, a MIRV payload would be significantly heavier, since it would consist of several nuclear warheads, each of them weighting about 400 kilogrammes. A 5-warhead MIRV, therefore, would weigh two tonnes.

As of 2012, the primary module for MIRV was in an advanced stage of development. It will be deployed when deemed necessary, according to officials.

The MIRV capability of Agni-V has been tested indirectly in a discreet manner, according to Bharat Karnad, who was involved in drafting India's nuclear doctrine. Karnad states that the MIRV capability of the missile's guidance system on chip (SOC) was tested during the multi-satellite PSLV launch on 25 February 2013.

Reactions to testing

Domestic
In India, the success of the launch was received with much acclaim and widespread media coverage. Indian Prime Minister Narendra Modi as well as Defence Minister Rajnath Singh congratulated the DRDO.  Missile Program Director Avinash Chander hailed the launch saying it signified "giant strides." 

In November 2021, India tested the nuclear capable version of Agni-V successfully, followingly the statement received by Defence Ministry was
“A successful launch of the surface-to-surface ballistic missile, Agni-5, was carried out on October 27, 2021 at approximately 1950 hrs from APJ Abdul Kalam Island, Odisha.- Ministry of Defence”

Other states
 – A spokesman for China's Foreign Ministry said, "China and India are large developing nations. We are not competitors but partners. We believe that both sides should cherish the hard-won good state of affairs at present, and work hard to uphold friendly strategic co-operation to promote joint development and make positive contributions towards maintaining peace and stability in the region." The state-owned China Central Television (CCTV) reported that the test was "a historic moment for India, and it shows that India has joined the club of the countries that own ballistic missiles." However, CCTV listed some of the missile's shortcomings and reported that "it does not pose a threat in reality." More negative commentary can be found in Global Times, a state-run tabloid, which reported that India "still lags behind in infrastructure construction, but its society is highly supportive of developing nuclear power and the West chooses to overlook India's disregard of nuclear and missile control treaties" and warned India not to "over-estimate its strength". Subsequently, they also claimed that although India may have missiles that can reach all parts of China, India stands "no chance in an overall arms race" with the country.
 – Pakistani websites and news agencies prominently displayed news of the launch. An article by the Associated Press reported that Pakistani officials showed no concern, with the foreign office spokesman saying only that India had informed it of the test ahead of time in line with an agreement they have."
 – The BBC reported that the launch marked the moment India joined an "elite nuclear club" that also included China, Russia, France, the US, the UK and possibly Israel.
 – The United States stated that India boasted of an excellent non-proliferation record and that it had engaged with the international community on such issues. A US State Department spokesman said, "We urge all nuclear-capable states to exercise restraint regarding nuclear capabilities. That said, India has a solid non-proliferation record." Moreover, responding to comparisons with North Korea's attempted launch of a long-range rocket that same week, Jay Carney said that, "India's record stands in stark contrast to that of North Korea, which has been subject to numerous sanctions, as you know, by the United Nations Security Council."
 A Washington-based think tank has claimed that the US is supportive of India's efforts to close missile gap with China and is comfortable with the progress being made by New Delhi in this regard. Lisa Curtis, senior research fellow for South Asia, and Baker Spring, research fellow in National Security Policy, at The Heritage Foundation, a conservative think tank said in a commentary, "The lack of US condemnation of India's latest missile test demonstrates that the US is comfortable with Indian progress in the nuclear and missile fields and appreciates India's need to meet the emerging strategic challenge posed by rising China". "It is telling that no country has criticised India's missile test", the US experts wrote. "The US change in position with regard to Indian missile capabilities demonstrates how far the US-India relationship has evolved over the last decade", Curtis and Spring said.

International organisations
 – NATO Secretary General Anders Fogh Rasmussen stated that they did not think India was a missile threat, nor a threat to NATO and its allies, despite India's advancement in missile technology.

See also

References

External links

3D Model Video of Agni-V
Inside the Agni-5 missile lab

2012 in India
Ballistic missiles of India
Intermediate-range ballistic missiles
Intercontinental ballistic missiles
Military equipment introduced in the 2010s